Tyler Riggs (born February 25, 1986) is an American filmmaker, actor, and model.

Modeling career
His career in modeling began by accident when posing for a class project for his friend, a photography student. The friend's teacher suggested that Riggs pursue an actual career in modeling, and in 2007, Riggs signed with Red Model Management and moved to New York City. Since then, Riggs has been featured as an "exciting new face" and "model of the week" by Models.com. He was ranked at number seven on Forbes' June 2009 list of the most successful male models. He has also been featured as a style inspiration on the New York Times style blog The Moment. Riggs debuted at Gaetano Navarra in Milan during Milan Fashion Week F/W 2008-2009 and opened his first show - Neil Barrett. Since then he has walked the runway for the most important brands and designers like Alessandro Dell'Acqua, Alexander McQueen, Costume National, DKNY, Givenchy, Gucci, Hermès, Kenzo, Louis Vuitton, Marni, Moschino, and Thierry Mugler. He appeared on the cover of Sportswear International, GQ Style Russia, Contributing Editor and inside magazines such as Wonderland, V, VMAN, Another Man, Details, i-D, Numero Homme, L'Officiel Hommes, GQ and 10+ Magazine, as well as in print ad campaigns for Louis Vuitton, D&G, Topman, Ray-Ban, Diesel, Sisley, Bershka, Raoul Fashion, William Rast for Target and Converse by John Varvatos.

Acting career
He studied acting under the prestigious acting teacher William Esper at the William Esper Studio.

Personal life
Riggs is originally from Lutz, near Tampa, Florida. He writes and records music. He is married to Finnish model, Suvi Koponen.

Filmography

References 

1986 births
Living people
Male actors from Florida
Male actors from Los Angeles
Male actors from Tampa, Florida
Songwriters from Florida
Male models from Florida